Supreme Ladies F.C. is a Ghanaian professional women's football club based in Kumasi in the Ashanti Region of Ghana. The club features in the Ghana Women’s Premier League. Their rivals are Fabulous Ladies and Kumasi Sports Academy Ladies.

Grounds 
The club plays their home matches at the Okese Park in Ejisu.

Notable players 
In the 2020–21 season, Sandra Owusu-Ansah captained the side, she scored 10 goals ending the season as the club's top goal scorer, before joining Serbian club ZFK Spartak Subotica.

References

External links 

 Official Website
 Supreme Ladies FC on Twitter

Women's football clubs in Ghana